Omar Enrique Mallea Arca (born 8 March 1981 in Luján de Cuyo) is an Argentine professional footballer.

External links
 Profile at Terra.cl 
 Argentine Primera statistics

1981 births
Living people
Argentine footballers
Sportspeople from Mendoza Province
Association football midfielders
Club Atlético River Plate footballers
Rangers de Talca footballers
Audax Italiano footballers
FC Luzern players
Santiago Wanderers footballers
Argentine expatriate footballers
Expatriate footballers in Chile